The Wilder Street Historic District is a historic district in Lowell, Massachusetts.  The section of Wilder Street between Westford Street and Branch Road contains a remarkable collection of large late 19th-century houses.  About one dozen wealthy businessmen built elaborate houses in Queen Anne, Italianate, Stick, and Second Empire styles in this area, which was developed by its landowner, Charles Wilder, and it was considered one of the city's most fashionable addresses of the time.

The district was added to the National Register of Historic Places in 1995.

See also
National Register of Historic Places listings in Lowell, Massachusetts

References

Historic districts in Lowell, Massachusetts
National Register of Historic Places in Lowell, Massachusetts
Historic districts on the National Register of Historic Places in Massachusetts